Bundaberg is an electoral district of the Legislative Assembly of Queensland in central Queensland, Australia. It covers the city of Bundaberg, as well as the immediate surrounding area.

History
The electoral district of Bundaberg was created by the Electoral Districts Act of 1887 which abolished the electoral district of Mulgrave that had included the Bundaberg area. The first election held in the seat of Bundaberg was the 1888 election.

The city's urban population has long made the seat a Labor stronghold. This changed in 2005 when the practices of rogue surgeon Jayant Patel at the Bundaberg Base Hospital were uncovered. The Beattie government was seriously embarrassed by the subsequent Commissions of Inquiry into the matter, and as a result the seat was considered winnable for the Nationals.

In 2020, the Labor Party won the seat by nine votes. It is currently an extremely marginal seat.

Members for Bundaberg

Election results

References

External links
 Electorate profile (Antony Green, ABC)

Bundaberg
Bundaberg